Museo Histórico Municipal de San Fernando is a museum located at 63 Calle Real in San Fernando in the Province of Cádiz, Andalusia, Spain. The building was built in 1755 by a merchant of Cadiz, Alonso Ortega y Muñiz, on the grounds of the Dean of the Cathedral of Cadiz. Until its acquisition by the city, it housed the Clinic Empresa Nacional Bazán or Palomo Clinic from 1949. It was inaugurated as a municipal historical museum on 28 March 1986.

References

Museo Histórico Municipal de San Fernando
Museums in Andalusia
Museo Histórico Municipal de San Fernando
Museums established in 1986
Museo Histórico Municipal de San Fernando